Ochyrotica gielisi is a moth of the family Pterophoridae. It is known from Panama.

The wingspan is about 16 mm.

External links

Ochyroticinae
Moths described in 1990